The Modulightor Building is a commercial building in the Midtown East neighborhood of Manhattan, New York City. It was designed by noted architect Paul Rudolph and was built from 1989 to 1994.

The fifth and sixth floor of the building were constructed from 2007 to 2015, in a project led by the original project manager using Rudolph's preliminary designs for a six-story building on the site.

The four-story building was constructed for Modulightor, a company that Rudolph co-founded to sell light fixtures. It has seen commercial and residential uses, and later housed a gallery on its top floors. The gallery exhibited "Paul Rudolph: The Personal Laboratory" in 2018. The building currently holds Modulightor's fabrication center in the basement and on the first floor; the remaining spaces house the Paul Rudolph Institute for Modern Architecture and several duplexes. One of these duplexes is occupied by Ernst Wagner, the building's owner.

References

External links

 
 Paul Rudolph Institute for Modern Architecture
Entry on the building

Modernist architecture in New York City
Midtown Manhattan
Paul Rudolph buildings
1980s architecture in the United States
Office buildings in Manhattan